Small molecule sensors are an effective way to detect the presence of metal ions in solution. Although many types exist, most small molecule sensors comprise a subunit that selectively binds to a metal that in turn induces a change in a fluorescent subunit. This change can be observed in the small molecule sensor's spectrum, which can be monitored using a detection system such as a microscope or a photodiode. Different probes exist for a variety of applications, each with different dissociation constants with respect to a particular metal, different fluorescent properties, and sensitivities. They show great promise as a way to probe biological processes by monitoring metal ions at low concentrations in biological systems. Since they are by definition small and often capable of entering biological systems, they are conducive to many applications for which other more traditional bio-sensing are less effective or not suitable.

Uses

Metal ions are essential to virtually all biological systems and hence studying their concentrations with effective probes is highly advantageous. Since metal ions are key to the causes of cancer, diabetes, and other diseases, monitoring them with probes that can provide insight into their concentrations with spatial and temporal resolution is of great interest to the scientific community. There are many applications that one can envision for small molecule sensors. It has been shown that one can use them to differentiate effectively between acceptable and harmful concentrations of mercury in fish. Further, since some types of neurons uptake zinc during their operation, these probes can be used as a way to track activity in the brain and could serve as an effective alternative to functional MRI. One can also track and quantify the growth of a cell, such as a fibroblast, that uptakes metal ions as it constructs itself. Numerous other biological processes can be tracked using small molecule sensors as many change metal concentrations as they occur, which can then be monitored. Still, the sensor must be tailored for its specific environment and sensing requirements. Depending on the application, the metal sensor should be selective for a certain type of metal, and especially needs to be able to bind its target metal with greater affinity than metals that naturally exist at high concentrations within the cell . Further, they should provide a response with a strong modulation in fluorescent spectrum and hence provide a high signal-to-noise ratio. Finally, it is essential that a sensor is not toxic to the biological system in which it is used.

Mechanisms of detection

Most detection mechanisms involved in small molecule sensors comprise some modulation in the fluorescent behavior of the sensing molecule upon binding the target metal. When a metal coordinates to such a sensor, it may either enhance or reduce the original fluorescent emission. The former is known as the Chelation Enhancement Fluorescence effect (CHEF), while the latter is called the Chelation Enhancement Quenching effect (CHEQ). By changing the intensity of emission at different wavelengths, the resulting fluorescent spectrum may attenuate, amplify, or shift upon the binding and dissociation of a metal. This shift in spectra can be monitored using a detector such as a microscope or a photodiode.
Listed below are some examples of mechanisms by which emission is modulated. Their participation in CHEQ or CHEF is dependent on the metal and small molecule sensor in question.

Primary Mechanisms of Detection

Paramagnetic Fluorescence Quenching, the allowance of new electronic states upon binding a paramagnetic metal atom
Photoinduced Electron Transfer (PET), the blocking of a lower energy state due to the binding of a metal atom. 
Photoinduced Charge Transfer (PCT), the modulation of energy levels in a complex by charge transfer within a conjugated pi system.
Fluorescence Resonance Energy Transfer (FRET), the transfer of an exciton from a donor to an acceptor, modulating the emission spectrum.
Excimer/Exciplex formation, the formation of a state that is a hybrid of the ground and excited states. This has novel fluorescent properties. 
Chemodosimeters, complexes that undergo irreversible reactions with other species upon binding a metal to form new compounds with novel fluorescent spectra.

Fluorophores

Fluorophores are essential to our measurement of the metal binding event, and indirectly, metal concentration. There are many types, all with different properties that make them advantageous for different applications. Some work as small metal sensors completely on their own while others must be complexed with a subunit that can chelate or bind a metal ion. Rhodamine for example undergoes a conformation change upon the binding of a metal ion. In so doing it switches between a colorless, non-fluorescent spirocyclic form to a fluorescent, pink open cyclic form. Quinoline based sensors have been developed that form luminescent complexes with Cd(II) and fluorescent ones with Zn(II). It is hypothesized to function by changing its lowest luminescent state from n–* to –* when coordinating to a metal. 
When the Dansyl group DNS binds to a metal, it loses a sulfonamide hydrogen, causing fluorescence quenching via a PET or reverse PET mechanism in which an electron is transferred either to or from the metal that is bound.

Examples

Zinc
Zinc is one of the most common metal ions in biological systems. Small molecule sensors for it include:
ZX1, a compound comprizing a dipicolylamine (DPA) Zinc binding subunit that has greater affinity for Zinc than other species found in solution such as Ca and Mg. 
Zinpyr-1 (ZP1), a compound containing a dichlorofluorescein fluorescent compound bound to two 2-picolamine (DPA) species that bind Zn(II). ZP1 is part of a family of zinc sensors known as the Zinpyr series, the members of which are variants on ZP1 to enable specific affinities and fluorescence profiles.
ZnAF-1 sensors that comprise an aryl donor and a xanthenone acceptor and have a large change in fluorescence upon binding Zn(II). They have been used to study uptake of Zn(II) in CA3 pyramidal neurons.

Copper
Copper is a biologically important metal to detect. It has many sensors developed for it including:
CTAP-1, a sensor that shows a response in the UV region when Cu(I) binds to an azatetrathiacrown motif that in turn excites a pyrazoline-based dye that is attached. To use the probe, one excites it at 365 nm. If it is bound to Cu, then it will increase its fluorescence intensity. CTAP-1 is effective as it has a large modulation in its spectrum upon binding Cu, and is selective for the binding of Cu over other metals.
Coppersensor-1 (CS1) that comprises a thioether rich motif that binds to Cu(I) causing the excitation of a boron-dipyrromethene (BODIPY) dye in the visible region. The probe has good selectivity for Cu(I) over alkaline earth metals, Cu(II), and d-block metals.

Iron
Iron is used a great deal in biological systems, a fact that is well known due to its role in Hemoglobin. For it, there are many small molecule sensors including:
Pryrene-TEMPO, in which the binding of iron to TEMPO quenches the fluorescence of pyrene when no Fe(II) is bound. Upon binding however, TEMPO is reduced and pyrene regains fluorescence. This probe is limited in that an analogous response can be generated by unwanted free radicals, and that it can only by used in acidic solution.
DansSQ, in which Fe(II) binding increases fluorescence at 460 nm. It consists of a Dansyl group bound to styrylquinoline and operates by the disruption of intra-molecular charge transfer upon the binding of Fe(II). It is limited in that it is only soluble in acetonitrile in 10% H2O.

Cobalt
Cobalt sensors have been made that capitalize on the breaking of C-O bonds by Co(II) in a fluorescent probe known as Cobalt Probe 1 (CP1).

Mercury
Mercury is a toxic heavy metal, and as such it is important to be able to detect it in biological systems. Sensors include:
Mercury Sensors (MS), a family of sensors that comprise complexes of fluorescein and napthofluorescein. The MS1 probe increases its emission upon binding of Hg(II), while maintaining great affinity for mercury over other heavy metal ions.
The S3 sensor is based on a BODIPY complex which undergoes a significant increase in fluorescence upon the binding of Hg(II).
MF1 uses a soft thioether chelator for Hg(II) bound to a fluorescein-like xanthenone reporter. It has good contrast upon binding mercury and good selectivity. MF1 is sensitive enough that it has been proposed to be used to test fish for toxic levels of mercury.

See also

Chelation
Luminescence
Fluorescence
Fluorophore
Biosensor
Deoxyribozyme

References

Photochemistry
Chemical reactions
Optoelectronics
Sensors